Lake Tapawingo is a city in Jackson County, Missouri, United States. The population was 730 at the 2010 census.

History 
Lake Tapawingo was constructed by the Lake Tapawingo Development Company in 1926 as an "exclusive sports retreat and rest haven." The city takes its name from a lake of the same name within its borders. Derived from a Native American word meaning "beautiful water" or "beautiful place", it is also said to be named after an Indian princess. The City of Lake Tapawingo was officially formed in 1962 in order to prevent annexation by the larger cities of either Blue Springs, Missouri or Independence, Missouri.

Geography
Lake Tapawingo is located at  (39.019739, -94.309445).

Demographics

2010 census
As of the census of 2010, there were 730 people, 342 households, and 247 families residing in the city. The racial makeup of the city was 96.2% White, 0.7% African American, 0.5% Native American, 0.5% Asian, and 2.1% from two or more races. Hispanic or Latino of any race were 1.8% of the population.

There were 342 households, of which 18.1% had children under the age of 18 living with them, 62.0% were married couples living together, 7.3% had a female householder with no husband present, 2.9% had a male householder with no wife present, and 27.8% were non-families. 23.7% of all households were made up of individuals, and 9.6% had someone living alone who was 65 years of age or older. The average household size was 2.13 and the average family size was 2.45.

The median age in the city was 54.9 years. 11.2% of residents were under the age of 18; 5% were between the ages of 18 and 24; 16.8% were from 25 to 44; 42.4% were from 45 to 64; and 24.8% were 65 years of age or older. The gender makeup of the city was 48.5% male and 51.5% female.

2000 census

As of the census of 2000, there were 843 people, 350 households, and 259 families residing in the city. The population density was 2,454.6 people per square mile (957.3/km2). There were 373 housing units at an average density of 1,086.1 per square mile (423.6/km2). The racial makeup of the city was 97.98% White, 0.12% Asian, 0.71% from other races, and 1.19% from two or more races. Hispanic or Latino of any race were 2.25% of the population.

There were 350 households, out of which 22.3% had children under the age of 18 living with them, 67.7% were married couples living together, 4.6% had a female householder with no husband present, and 26.0% were non-families. 20.6% of all households were made up of individuals, and 6.9% had someone living alone who was 65 years of age or older. The average household size was 2.41 and the average family size was 2.79.

In the city the population was spread out, with 19.6% under the age of 18, 5.5% from 18 to 24, 20.5% from 25 to 44, 38.2% from 45 to 64, and 16.3% who were 65 years of age or older. The median age was 47 years. For every 100 females, there were 99.3 males. For every 100 females age 18 and over, there were 96.0 males.

The median income for a household in the city was $73,500, and the median income for a family was $77,493. Males had a median income of $52,708 versus $31,518 for females. The per capita income for the city was $32,141. About 2.6% of families and 3.3% of the population were below the poverty line, including 5.5% of those under age 18 and 2.4% of those age 65 or over.

Education 
Lake Tapawingo is served by the Blue Springs R-IV School District.

References

Cities in Jackson County, Missouri
Cities in Missouri
Tapawingo